Yangho may be,

Cho Yangho
the spurious Yangho language